Brian David Ripley FRSE (born 29 April 1952) is a British statistician. From 1990, he was professor of applied statistics at the University of Oxford and is also a professorial fellow at St Peter's College. He retired August 2014 due to ill health.

Biography
Ripley has made contributions to the fields of spatial statistics and pattern recognition. His work on artificial neural networks in the 1990s helped to bring aspects of machine learning and data mining to the attention of statistical audiences. He emphasised the value of robust statistics in his books Modern Applied Statistics with S and Pattern Recognition and Neural Networks.

Ripley helped develop the S programming language and its implementations: S-PLUS and R. He co-authored two books based on S, Modern Applied Statistics with S and S Programming. From 2000 to 2021 he was one of the most active committers to the R core.

He was educated at the University of Cambridge, where he was awarded both the Smith's Prize (at the time awarded to the best graduate essay writer who had been undergraduate at Cambridge in that cohort) and the Rollo Davidson Prize. The university also awarded him the Adams Prize in 1987 for an essay entitled Statistical Inference for Spatial Processes, later published as a book. He served on the faculty of Imperial College, London from 1976 until 1983, at which point he moved to the University of Strathclyde.

Authored books
 Ripley, B. D. (1981) Spatial Statistics. Wiley, 252pp. .
 Ripley, B. D. (1983) Stochastic Simulation. Wiley, .
 
 Ripley, B. D. (1996) Pattern Recognition and Neural Networks. Cambridge University Press. 403 pages. .
 Venables, W. N. and Ripley, B. D. (2000) S Programming. Springer, 264pp. .
 Venables, W. N. and Ripley, B. D. (2002) Modern Applied Statistics with S (Fourth Edition; previous editions published as Modern Applied Statistics with S-PLUS in 1994, 1997 & 1999). Springer, 462pp. .

References

External links 
 Brian Ripley's home page at the University of Oxford

1952 births
British statisticians
Fellows of the Royal Society of Edinburgh
Machine learning researchers
Artificial intelligence researchers
Living people
Fellows of St Peter's College, Oxford
R (programming language) people
Spatial statisticians
Computational statisticians